Adrienne Vittadini (born October 9, 1943, in Győr, Hungary) is an American fashion designer.

When she was 13, her family fled Győr during the 1956 Hungarian revolution. In 1979, she started what would become a multimillion-dollar fashion business as a hobby. She uses vibrant colors and prints and produces clothing, handbags, swimsuits, shoes, eyewear, and perfumes. Her company was purchased by Retail Brand Alliance in 2001.

She has appeared in an advertisement for Rolex, wearing the Rolex Explorer II.

She now lives seasonally in Sarasota, Florida, where she went into the home fashion and house design business.

In April 2017, some Ivanka Trump clothing items were mistakenly labeled as Adrienne Vittadini items before being sold to Stein Mart. G-III Apparel Group, the company that licenses Ivanka Trump brand clothing, then took responsibility for mislabeling the clothing, and said they were taking steps to remove mislabeled items from stores.

References

External links

 
 

American fashion designers
American women fashion designers
Moore College of Art and Design alumni
1943 births
Living people
Hungarian emigrants to the United States
American fashion businesspeople
People from Győr
People from Sarasota, Florida
21st-century American women